Camphor is a David Sylvian compilation album released in 2002 as a companion to Everything and Nothing. The focus is on his instrumental work.

Background
Both "Camphor" and "The Song Which Gives the Key to Perfection" were originally released on the bonus CD included with Everything and Nothing tour book.

In "The Song Which Gives the Key to Perfection" Sylvian sings a chapter from a Hindu holy text. It is sung in the original Sanskrit from the book called ‘Chandi Path’.

"Wave" has been cut to the last segment of the original song which omits the vocal parts. New original sounds orchestrated by Simon Jeffes were added. "Mother and Child (remix)" has vocal replaced by trumpet and the music was sampled and remixed by Jan Bang and Erik Honoré. "Upon This Earth" is shorter. The first two minutes were cut, so Robert Frost poem "The Foreboding" is no longer heard and pitch is changed in error due to mastering issues. (The entry here said re-recorded, but the Robert Fripp guitar solo is identical to original and the mix is best described as the artist revisiting analog master tapes with Pro-Tools.) 

It was released in two versions. A standard single disc jewel case (CDVE 962) and as a limited edition 2CD digipak (CDVEX 962).

Track listing

Disc One
"All of My Mother's Names"
"Red Earth (As Summertime Ends)"
"Answered Prayers"
"The Song Which Gives the Key to Perfection (Siddha Kunjika Stotram)
 originally featured on the CD accompanying the 2002 Everything and Nothing Tour Programme
"New Moon at Red Deer Wallow"
"Praise (Pratah Smarami)"
"Wave [Version]"
"Mother and Child [Version]"
"Plight (The Spiralling of Winter Ghosts) [Detail]"
"Upon This Earth [Remix]"
"Big Wheels in Shanty Town"
"The Healing Place"
"Camphor"
 originally featured on the CD accompanying the 2002 Everything and Nothing Tour Programme
"A Brief Conversation Ending in Divorce"

Disc Two (Limited Edition Only)

"Plight (The Spiralling of Winter Ghosts) [Remixed Version]"
"Mutability (A New Beginning Is in the Offing) [Detail]"
"Premonition (Giant Empty Iron Vessel) [Remixed Version]"

Disc one:
Tracks 1, 6 from Dead Bees on a Cake.
Tracks 2, 5, 11 from Rain Tree Crow.
Tracks 3, 7, 10, 12 from Gone to Earth.
Track 8 from Secrets of the Beehive.
Track 14 from Pop Song single.

Personnel
Exclusively about the unreleased or re-recorded tracks.

"Answered Prayers": Bill Nelson (acoustic guitar), David Sylvian (guitar, voice).
"The Song Which Gives the Key to Perfection": Shree Maa (composer, tambura), David Sylvian (vocals, electric piano, guitar, bass, arrangement).
"Wave (Version)" Steve Jansen (drums), Robert Fripp (guitar), Simon Jeffes (orchestration), David Sylvian (Hammond, synth, bass, remixing).
"Mother and Child": David Torn (acoustic guitar), Danny Thompson (double bass), Danny Cummings (percussion), Ryuichi Sakamoto (piano, Hammond), Erik Honoré (remixing, sampler), Jan Bang (remixing, sampler, synth), Nils Petter Molvær (trumpet, effects).
"Plight (The Spiralling of Winter Ghosts) Detail": Holger Czukay (electronics, organ, piano, orchestra, effects), David Sylvian (harmonium, guitar, synth, remixing).
"Upon This Earth": Robert Fripp (guitar), David Sylvian (guitar, piano, synth, remixing).
"The Healing Place": Bill Nelson (guitar solo), David Sylvian (guitar, synth).
"Camphor": David Sylvian (all instruments).

Additional personnel
Kevin Westenberg – photography
Russell Mills – design
Michael Webster – assistant designer

Mastering problems
"The Healing Place" and "Answered Prayers" are both mastered improperly in two ways: they were 44,100 Hz recordings that were mistakenly played back during mastering at 48,000 Hz; their waveforms are inverted, though the channel assignments are correct. Upon playing they appear to be shorter (4:52.173 vs. 5:18.074 for The Healing Place and 2:45.426 vs 3:00.137 for Answered Prayers) and play as if in a different key. The recordings can be fixed by upsampling Camphor's versions to 48,000 Hz then setting the resulting file's sample rate to 44,100 Hz then inverting the sample data. This would result in essentially the same files as would be found on the remastered version of Gone To Earth

References 

2002 compilation albums
David Sylvian compilation albums
Virgin Records compilation albums